Edward River is a rural locality in the Shire of Cook, Queensland, Australia. In the  Edward River had a population of 0 people.

Geography
This inland locality on the Cape York Peninsula is named for the Edward River that runs through it towards the Gulf of Carpentaria. Strathgordon Road passes through the locality from Yarraden in the east towards   Pormpuraaw in the west on the Gulf.

History 
Kuuk Thaayorre (also known as Koko-Daiyuri, Kuku Yak, Thayorre, and used as a generic name for several related languages/dialects) is an Australian Aboriginal Language spoken on Western Cape York, particularly in the area around Pormpuraaw (Edward River). The Thaayorre language region includes the local government areas of the Aboriginal Shire of Pormpuraaw and the Shire of Cook.

Kugu Mu'inh ( also known as Wik Muinh, Kuku Muinh, Wik Muin, Kuku-Mu'inh. See also related Wik languages) is a traditional language of the area which includes landscape within the local government boundaries of the Cook Shire.

In the  Edward River had a population of 0 people.

References

Shire of Cook
Populated places in Far North Queensland
Localities in Queensland